Pseudogynoxys chenopodioides (syn. Senecio confusus), known commonly as the Mexican flamevine, is a climber in the family Asteraceae, native to Mexico, Central America and the West Indies.

Description

Pseudogynoxys chenopodioides is a twining, herbaceous vine with smooth stems and alternate arrowhead-shaped evergreen leaves sometimes reaching a height of ).

It has orange to red ray flowers and orange disc flowers, and ribbed fruits with persistent bristles that profusely appear from spring to fall. The plant will sporadically bloom all year-round in mild winter climates.

Cultivation

The Mexican flamevine is prized as an ornamental because of its showy flowers. It is widely grown in gardens in parts of the United States. It requires full sun, well-drained soil, and either a trellis or a shrub to climb on.

In colder areas, frost will kill the shoots, but the roots can survive the winter in most of the contiguous United States. It can be grown as an annual plant in a cold climate due to its rapid growth rate. If not grown as a vine, it will grow in a sprawling shrub-like form.

It is cultivated in Florida and has been reported as persisting after cultivation there, growing on disturbed sites.

P. chenopodioides is a nonhost of Digitivalva delaireae and this moth is an ineffective biocontrol of invasive Flame Vine

Taxonomy
The plant's former scientific name Senecio confusus translates to "confused old man", which refers to the pappus bristles on the achenes and the vine's rampant habit of growth, respectively. Without support, a "confusion" of stems change the plant into a straggly shrub.

Gallery

References

Flora of Florida
Flora of Mexico
Flora of Central America
Flora of the Caribbean
Taxa named by Ángel Lulio Cabrera
chenopodioides